The men's individual road race was a cycling event at the 2004 Summer Olympics. It was held on 14 August 2004. There were 144 competitors from 43 nations. The maximum number of cyclists per nation had been set at five since professionals were allowed in 1996. The event was won by Paolo Bettini of Italy, the nation's first victory in the men's individual road race since 1992 and fifth overall (three more than any other nation). Sérgio Paulinho's silver was Portugal's first medal in the event. Belgium earned its first medal in the men's road race since 1964 with Axel Merckx's bronze.

Summary

In a race that showed numerous break away attempts, it wasn't until Paolo Bettini and Sérgio Paulinho broke away from the group with a couple of laps remaining and opened up a comfortable gap on the final lap that an idea of the medal positions could be gained. With the peloton giving up the chase of the leaders, Axel Merckx broke away to open up a sufficient gap for him to take bronze. Bettini out sprinted Paulinho for the gold, finishing in a time of 5 hours 41 minutes and 44 seconds. Among the other pre-race favourites, World Champion Igor Astarloa of Spain crashed on the opening lap, and 2000 Olympic road race champion Jan Ullrich finished among the peloton in 19th place. A number of other top names in the field, including Germany's Andreas Klöden and Russia's Viatcheslav Ekimov, pulled out before the end of the race, presumably with the Time Trial race, to be held four days later, in mind.

Background

This was the 17th appearance of the event, previously held in 1896 and then at every Summer Olympics since 1936. It replaced the individual time trial event that had been held from 1912 to 1932; the time trial had been re-introduced in 1996 alongside the road race. Of the top 10 cyclists from 2000, all three medalists plus three more cyclists returned: gold medalist Jan Ullrich of Germany, silver medalist Alexander Vinokourov of Kazakhstan, bronze medalist Andreas Klöden of Germany, sixth-place finisher Frank Høj of Denmark, eighth-place finisher George Hincapie of the United States, and ninth-place finisher Paolo Bettini of Italy. Lance Armstrong, having just won his sixth consecutive Tour de France, did not compete. Reigning world champion Igor Astarloa of Spain did compete.

Serbia and Montenegro made its debut in the men's individual road race. Great Britain made its 17th appearance in the event, the only nation to have competed in each appearance to date.

Competition format and course

The mass-start race was on a 211.2 kilometre course in Athens' Plateia Kozia. Using a city-streets course, "[r]ather than riding in the hilly country outside of Athens", resulted in a "relatively flat course" that did not challenge the professional peloton.

Schedule

All times are Greece Standard Time (UTC+2)

Results

There were 75 finishers, with three (plus one non-finisher) later disqualified for doping.

References

External links
Official Olympic Report

M
Cycling at the Summer Olympics – Men's road race
Men's events at the 2004 Summer Olympics